South Melbourne Football Club can refer to:
Sydney Swans, an Australian rules football club known as the South Melbourne Football Club until 1982
South Melbourne FC, a soccer club formerly known as South Melbourne SC, Hellas Hakoah and South Melbourne Hellas